Alfred Provis (18 February 1818 – 8 August 1890) was an English painter and draughtsman.

Biography
He was born on 18 February 1818 in Chippenham in a house now called Orwell house in 54-55 New Road, son of John Provis, a timber merchant and builder, and Ann Banks. He left Chippenham at an early age, and studied in London with John Wood (1801 – 1870) history and portrait painter. Except for very short periods, the young artist remained in London.  He specialised in Victorian charming domestic interior scenes in cottages and farmhouses   with ladies and children painted with a palette of luminous brown. He exhibited over 100 paintings at the Royal Academy, Suffolk Street, British Institution and Society of British Artists from 1846 to 1876. He lived in Brentford Ealing near London and then at Kingston Lisle, where he was also occupied with Berkshire scenes; he often left England for some months and travelled  in North Wales, Brittany and Normandy. His works are shown in the collections of the V&A Museum, Aberdeen Art Gallery, Atkinson Art Gallery and Library and in other public collections.   In some paintings the artist represented his cottage at Kingston Lisle Wantage, Berks and the subjects in these genre paintings are of the artist's own family, his wife, Ellen Andrews, married in 1851, and his two  daughters, Mary and Ellen Agnes. Ellen  died in 1911 at the age of 57; she   was an engineer who in 1891 married  Vaughan Cornish, scientist and geographer and director of technical education to the Hampshire County Council.  Provis died on 8 August 1890 in his beloved cottage in Kingston Lisle.

Artwork
Provis's works illustrate the artist's observation and his great attention to details so that the objects stand out on the canvas as real and living things. His palette of luminous browns often shows us a domestic scene that takes place in a typical rustic cottage of the time. And the painter, thanks to his great miniaturistic skill, describes in a quite, intimate and  enchanted atmosphere all the particulars of the rooms. In an amber sunny light we can appreciate  country  furniture, pots and pans hang from the rafters, the always present fireplace, baskets of fruits and vegetables, sleepy pets rest on rustic stone floors, iron hooks in the  stone walls that hold objects and country clothes. In these environments the sunlight, which penetrates through the few windows, moves slowly in an almost suspended time and shows scenes of quiet solitude, of a time gone: reading a letter, preparing the meal, sewing and knitting, looking after an infant or simply peeling fruits or vegetables. A charming  and idyllic portrait  of a quiet and simple life.

Works
 “Minding Baby”, Oil on canvas, V&A Museum of Childhood
 “A Dog's Lesson”, dated 1860, Oil on canvas, Victoria and Albert Museum.
 “Feeding Time”, Oil on canvas, Wolverhampton Art Gallery
 “Interior, Girl Reading”, Oil on canvas, Ferens Art Gallery
 “Interior, Lady Knitting”, Oil on canvas, Ferens Art Gallery
 “A Cottage Interior” Oil on canvas, Atkinson Art Gallery Collection
 “A Woman Watching Chickens”, Oil on canvas, Wolverhampton Art Gallery
 “The Blacksmith's Forge”, Oil on canvas, Aberdeen Art Gallery & Museums
 “Cottage Interior”, Oil on canvas, Bury Art Museum
 “Harvest Ale”, Oil on canvas, Harris Museum & Art Gallery
 “A lady knutting”, Oil on canvas, dated 1880, Hull museum.
 “A cottage interior in Kingstone Lisle Wantage, Berks” Alfred Provis's cottage, Oil on canvas, dated 1876.

References

1818 births
1891 deaths
19th-century English painters
English male painters
British genre painters
British draughtsmen
19th-century English male artists